Studienrat (abbreviated StR) is an official title/rank of higher teachers in the German and Austrian education system. Even though the German and Austrian education systems use the same term, there are differences in the level and usage of this rank.

Austria
In Austria,  is an honorary title awarded to people in the field of education.

Germany
In the German education system,  is an official title and rank for tenured higher teachers at secondary schools (Gymnasium), tenured higher scientific teachers at vocational schools, technical colleges and further education colleges teaching at least till Bachelor's level and for Senior lecturers and Assistant professors at universities. Higher scientific teachers at Germany must hold facultas docendis in at least two different subjects.

Form of address 
In Germany, a holder of the title/rank  (StR) is typically addressed by his title/rank followed by his other degrees in the same way as a holder of the title/rank of professor is addressed, for instance: "Herr Studienrat Dr. Schmidt" (or abbreviated: "StR Dr. Schmidt").

Salary and rank

Requirements 
Prerequisite for this title/rank is at least the "First State Examination for Teachers" called Staatsexamen (equivalent to Master of Education - EQF-Level 7) called "Erste Staatspruefung fuer Lehramt an Gymnasium" (secondary schools) or "Erste Staatspruefung fuer Lehramt an beruflichen Schulen" (vocational schools/further education colleges)
and the "Second State Examination for Teachers" (Master-level + 2 years of intense teacher training).
The degree of Master of Education, which was established 2005 under the Bologna Process is accepted as equal to the "First State Examination for Teachers"(1. Staatsexamen) and allows entrance to the second phase of the German teacher education called Referendariat or Vorbereitungsdienst.

The "First State Examination" takes at least 4.5–5 years of studies and finishes with a thesis, a viva voce examination and several written and oral tests.

Graduates of the "Second State Examination for Teachers" receive the teaching license in at least two subjects and the professional title/degree 
"Lehrer mit Lehramt fuer..." which stands for "Teacher with teaching license for secondary schools" or "Teacher with teaching license for vocational schools".

Only after passing the "First State Examination" and the "Second State Examination" are German teachers fully qualified. The duration of complete German teacher education is  about 7 years of higher education (Master-level + 2 years of postgraduate studies).

Applicants for "State Examination" studies are required to have the German General University Entrance Qualification called Allgemeine Hochschulreife or in other words called Abitur.

For teachers working at universities, the "Second State Examination for Teachers" may be replaced by a doctorate.

The "Second State Examination for Teachers" takes 2 years training at a special teacher academy called Studienseminar. The workload of this so-called Referendariat or Vorbereitungsdienst is 3600 hours (comparable to ~120 ECTS) consisting of at least 1080 hours course work in 12 modules with oral and written tests at the teacher academy, teaching in the two studied subjects in different schools and a thesis in the field of education.
In some cases, the second Staatsexamen can be a substitute for a doctorate when it comes to applying for certain jobs at a university (i.e., Akademischer Rat).

Appointment and granting of title
The title/rank of  can be awarded only by the government of one of the states of Germany, for example the state of Hesse.
Granting this title/rank makes the holder a Beamter (civil servant having tenure), employed by the  government.

After at least three years of probation time
and many additional examinations the title/rank Studienrat auf Lebenszeit can be granted by the government giving tenure for lifetime (Beamter auf Lebenszeit).

Notable holders of title 

See also
 Academic ranks in Germany

References

External links

Education in Germany
Education in Austria